Rock House Army Camp is a military base located at Modera, north of Colombo in the Western Province of Sri Lanka. It serves as the regimental headquarters of the Sri Lanka Armoured Corps of Sri Lanka Army.

History
The base gains its name from the Rock House, a stately home built in the nineteenth century by Henry Augustus Marshall, an Englishman who accompanied Lord North who was the first British Governor of Ceylon. Marshall was an officer in the Ceylon Civil Service and went on to serve as Auditor General of Ceylon. He built Rock House in addition to his other houses Whist Bungalow and Modera House. Later it became the residence of Sir William Coke, the Chief Justice of Ceylon.

The estate was taken over by the British Army and the Modera battery of three BL 6 inch Mk VII naval guns within casemates and with individual underground ammunition stores, with a Fire control tower and concrete quarters that were built for the gun crews. The Modera battery made up the norther sector of the coastal artillery batteries deployed for the defence of the Colombo harbor. With the outbreak of World War II, the coastal batteries in Colombo were manned by the 1st Coast Regiment, Ceylon Garrison Artillery. The base was occupied by the Ceylon Artillery of the newly formed Ceylon Army after Ceylon gained independence in 1948. In 1957 the 1st Reconnaissance Squadron moved in and was made a full recce regiment in 1958. There by the 1st Reconnaissance Regiment became the first unit of the Ceylon Armoured Corps. In 1962, the coastal artillery were decommissioned and the Ceylon Armoured Corps took over the base from the Ceylon Artillery which moved out. Since the 1960s the unit provided armored units for the defence of the capital in crisis situations and civil unrest.

See also
Sri Lanka Armoured Corps

References

Rock House should be our First Home

Sri Lankan Army bases
Government buildings in Colombo
Houses in Colombo
Former official residences in Sri Lanka
British colonial architecture in Sri Lanka
Manor houses in Sri Lanka
Sri Lanka Artillery
Sri Lanka Armoured Corps